Bellos is a surname. Notable people with the surname include:

Alex Bellos, author of books on mathematics and football
David Bellos, English translator and biographer, father of Alex Bellos
Linda Bellos (born 1950), British activist and London politician.